KYLI (96.7 FM, La Campesina 96.7 FM) is a radio station serving the Moapa Valley, St. George, Utah the stations is Licensed to Bunkerville, Nevada, The Chavez Radio Group outlet operates at 96.7 MHz with an ERP of 13 kW and broadcasts from a transmitter site near the Arizona border south of Bunkerville.

The station, which previously had a Country format with the call letters KHIJ, flipped to a new interactive Dance Top 40 radio format known as Jelli, replacing former co-owned sister station KXLI's former format after it flipped to Jelli's interactive Rock format, in June 2011.
 
On June 24, 2014, KYLI announced that it has ended its three-year partnership with Jelli. On June 25, the station adopted the Pulse 87 Dance/EDM brand and relaunched as "Pulse 96.7," under the programming guidance of former KVBE consultant and Pulse 87 owner Joel Salkowitz. The launch of the "Pulse" brings that brand back to radio just five years after its demise at WNYZ-LP/New York City and its failed attempt to expand the brand to other cities. As of January 1, 2016, KYLI continues with the "Pulse" branding, as the Pulse 87 online broadcasts signed off the air due to an increase in copyright royalty fees to keep internet broadcasters operating, a move that resulted in owners of Internet-only stations going dark before the changes can go into effect. The New York online stream came back in March 2016 after finding another platform.

On August 18, 2016, KYLI was sold to the Farmworker Educational Radio Network, Inc., who announced that the station would flip formats to Regional Mexican after the sale closes. The Dance format would move to online only with listeners being directed to the Pulse 87 website. The sale, at a price of $850,000, was consummated on October 25, 2016, and On October 26, 2016, KYLI flipped to Regional Mexican.

The station previously operated a co-channel booster, KYLI-FM1 in Sunrise Manor, Nevada, closer to Las Vegas. On October 11, 2019, the authorization for the booster was surrendered for cancellation. As Of 2021, The Station purchased and now operates under K244EX-FM Translator on 96.7FM To Rebroadcast Back To The Las Vegas Valley.

Former logos

References

 4.

External links
http://campesina.net/lasvegas/

YLI
Radio stations established in 2008
2008 establishments in Nevada